Anna Petronella "Ans or Annie" Timmermans (10 April 1919 – 21 August 1958) was a Dutch swimmer who won a gold medal in the 4 × 100 m freestyle relay at the 1934 European Championships. Two years later she competed in the 400 m freestyle at the 1936 Olympics, but failed to reach the final.

References

1919 births
1958 deaths
Dutch female freestyle swimmers
Olympic swimmers of the Netherlands
Swimmers at the 1936 Summer Olympics
Swimmers from Rotterdam
European Aquatics Championships medalists in swimming
Road incident deaths in Australia
Dutch emigrants to Australia
20th-century Dutch women